Jaymes is a surname. Notable people with the surname include:

Jessica Jaymes (1979–2019), American pornographic actress
Christopher Jaymes, American television and film actor, director, screenwriter, and producer
David Jaymes, English musician and songwriter
Terry Jaymes, radio host

See Also
Jaymes Mansfield, American drag queen